Brisaster fragilis is a species of sea urchins of the family Schizasteridae. Their armour is covered with spines. Brisaster fragilis was first scientifically described in 1844 by Düben & Koren.

References 

fragilis